Norwood Park Historic District may refer to
Norwood Park Historical District, Chicago, Illinois
Norwood Park Historic District (Asheville, North Carolina), among the National Register of Historic Places listings in Buncombe County, North Carolina